Mutya ng Pilipinas 2003, the 35th edition of Mutya ng Pilipinas, Inc., was held on May 31, 2003 with Jamie Liz Castillo proclaimed as the winner of Mutya ng Pilipinas Asia Pacific who bested 23 other candidates.

Results
Color keys

Special awards

Contestants

Crossovers from major national pageants prior to this date
 Mutya #16 Rhea Rizza Justo was Miss Philippines Earth 2002 candidate
 Mutya #18 May Fortes was Miss Philippines Earth 2002 Top 10 semifinalist
 Mutya #23 Fiona Marie Lava was Miss Philippines Earth 2002 Top 10 semifinalist & Binibining Pilipinas 2006 Top 10 Finalist

Post-pageant notes
 Mutya ng Pilipinas Asia Pacific, Jamie Liz Castillo competed at Miss Asia Pacific 2003 in Quezon City, Philippines and was Top 10 semifinalist
 Mutya 1st runner-up, Angeline Tucio competed at Miss Tourism International 2003-2004 in Malaysia but unplaced
 Mutya 2nd runner-up, Fiona Marie Lava did not compete at Miss Intercontinental 2003 pageant but competed at Model of the World at Athens, Greece.

References

External links
 Official Mutya ng Pilipinas website
  Mutya ng Pilipinas 2012 is on!

2003 beauty pageants
2003 in the Philippines
2003